Corbet railway station was a railway station in the city of Corbet on the Great Northern Railway which ran from Banbridge to Castlewellan in Northern Ireland.

History

The station was opened on 1 March 1880 and closed on 2 May 1955.

References 

Disused railway stations in County Down
Railway stations opened in 1880
Railway stations closed in 1955
1880 establishments in Ireland
1955 disestablishments in Ireland
Railway stations in Northern Ireland opened in the 19th century